USNS Persistent (T-AGOS-6) was a Stalwart-class Modified Tactical Auxiliary General Ocean Surveillance Ship of the United States Navy.

Stalwart-class ships were originally designed to collect underwater acoustical data in support of Cold War anti-submarine warfare operations in the 1980s.  Ex-USNS Persistent is now T/S State of Michigan, owned by the U.S. Department of Transportation's Maritime Administration and assigned to the Great Lakes Maritime Academy, Traverse City, Michigan.

Design
The Stalwart-class ocean surveillance ships were succeeded by the longer Victorious-class ocean surveillance ships. It was powered by a diesel-electric system of four Caterpillar D-398 diesel-powered generators and two General Electric  electric motors. This produced a total of  that drove two shafts. It had a gross register tonnage of 1,584 and a deadweight tonnage of 786.

They were built to be fitted with the Surveillance Towed Array Sensor System (SURTASS) system. The ship had an endurance of thirty days. Its complement was between thirty-two and forty-seven. Its hull design was similar to that of the Powhatan-class fleet ocean tugs.

References

External links

NavSource
NMC

 

Stalwart-class ocean surveillance ships
Cold War auxiliary ships of the United States
Training ships of the United States
Ships built by Tacoma Boatbuilding Company
1985 ships